The Lantern (1881–present) is the official, daily student-published university newspaper at The Ohio State University.

The Lantern may also refer to:
 The Lantern, comedic paper edited by John Brougham
 The Lantern, South Australian satirical newspaper owned by Frank Skeffington Carroll 
 The Lantern (Cape newspaper), early newspaper of the Cape Colony
 The Lantern (1925 film), Czech film directed by Karel Lamač
 The Lantern (1938 film), Czech film directed by Karel Lamač
 "The Lantern (song)", by the Rolling Stones

See also

 Lantern (disambiguation)
 The Lanterns, islands in the Tasman Island Group